Up in It is the second album by the Afghan Whigs, released in 1990 via Sub Pop. It marked the first time Sub Pop had released an album by a band hailing from outside the northwestern United States.

Production
The album was produced by Jack Endino.

Critical reception
Trouser Press wrote: "Typically gauzy Jack Endino production instantly brands Up in It as a Sub Pop issue. While the increased volume follows suit, the Whigs still wax more lyrical than their thrash’n’burn label contemporaries." The New Rolling Stone Album Guide wrote that "thudding production hides the band's latent smarts in sludge." The Dallas Observer deemed the album "the first indication grunge could be created in a vacuum (i.e., Cincinnati) by four isolated 20-year-olds just as potently as if it were manufactured by a whole slew of Mark Arms."

Track listing
All tracks written by Greg Dulli except where noted.
"Retarded" (Dulli, McCollum) – 3:25
"White Trash Party" – 3:05
"Hated" – 3:37
"Southpaw" – 3:20
"Amphetamines and Coffee" (Kopasz) – 1:55
"Now We Can Begin" - 2.43 [LP/Cassette version] OR "Hey Cuz" – 3:49 [CD version]
"You My Flower" – 3:48
"Son of the South" – 4:12
"I Know Your Little Secret" – 4:22
"Big Top Halloween" (Dulli, Curley) – 3:31 [CD version only]
"Sammy" (Dulli, Curley) – 3:15 [CD version only]
"In My Town" (Dulli, Curley) – 2:59 [CD version only]
"I Am the Sticks" – 4:19 [CD version only]

References

External links
Album LP/Cassette track listing on the Summer's Kiss website
Album CD track listing on the Summer's Kiss website

The Afghan Whigs albums
1990 albums
Sub Pop albums